Mustapha Seffouhi Stadium is a multi-use stadium in Batna, Algeria. It is used mostly for football matches and is the home ground of CA Batna. The stadium holds 5,000 people.

See also 
1st November Stadium

References

External links 
 Stade Seffouhi file - soccerway.com

Mustapha Seffouhi
Batna, Algeria
Buildings and structures in Batna Province